Moninhas is a neighbourhood of the Portuguese city of Póvoa de Varzim. Located in the south of Barreiros/Moninhas district, Moninhas is where the weekly fair of the city is located.

The most ancient reference to Moninhas appears in 1586, as Agra de Moninhas of Giesteira, in Póvoa's border. In the place, some ancient farming families existed, but the settlement of the neighbourhood seems to have occurred after the 16th century.

Neighbourhoods of Póvoa de Varzim